Callechelys bitaeniata is an eel in the family Ophichthidae (worm/snake eels). It was described by Wilhelm Peters in 1877. It is a tropical, marine eel which is known from the western Indian Ocean, including Kenya, Mozambique and Seychelles. Males can reach a maximum total length of 82 centimetres.

The species epithet "bitaeniata" means "two-striped" in Latin. Due to its large distribution and lack of notable threats, the IUCN redlist currently lists the species as Least Concern.

References

Ophichthidae
Fish described in 1877
Taxa named by Wilhelm Peters